The Colombian wood turtle (Rhinoclemmys melanosterna) is one of nine species of turtle belonging to the genus Rhinoclemmys of the family Geoemydidae. It is found in Colombia, Ecuador, and Panama.

References 

Bibliography
 
 

Rhinoclemmys
Reptiles of Colombia
Reptiles of Ecuador
Reptiles of Panama
Reptiles described in 1861